KCRF-FM (96.7 FM, "The Home of Classic Rock") is a radio station broadcasting a classic rock music format. It is licensed to Lincoln City, Oregon, United States.  The station is currently owned by Pacific West Broadcasting and features programming from Westwood One.

History
The station was assigned the call letters KCRF on August 3, 1981.

References

External links

CRF-FM
Classic rock radio stations in the United States
Lincoln City, Oregon
Radio stations established in 1981
1981 establishments in Oregon